Tom Nilsson (born August 19, 1993) is a Swedish professional ice hockey defenceman, currently playing under contract to Frölunda HC in the Swedish Hockey League (SHL). Nilsson was drafted by the Toronto Maple Leafs, 100th overall in the 2011 NHL Entry Draft while playing in the Swedish HockeyAllsvenskan with Mora IK.

Playing career
On March 19, 2013, Nilsson was signed to a three-year entry-level contract with the Toronto Maple Leafs. He was loaned to further develop in the Swedish Hockey League with Frölunda HC for the 2013–14 season. After his first season in North America with the Maple Leafs AHL affiliate, the Toronto Marlies, Nilsson was traded approaching the final year of his contract, along with four other prospects, to the New York Islanders in exchange for Michael Grabner on September 17, 2015.

On October 8, 2015, after an unsuccessful attempt to make the Islanders roster and little interest in continuing in the AHL, Nilsson was mutually released from contract with the Islanders. He returned to Sweden and re-joined Frölunda HC into the 2015–16 season, on a three-year contract on October 9, 2015.

After his first season in his return with Frölunda HC, in which he won the Swedish championship as well as the Champions Hockey League, Nilsson was again attracted by NHL interest and signed a one-year, two-way contract with the Vancouver Canucks on May 26, 2016. Unable to make the Canucks opening night roster, Nilsson was reassigned to AHL affiliate, the Utica Comets where he played out the duration of his contract for the 2016–17 season.

As an impending restricted free agent, Nilsson opted to return to his homeland in agreeing to a two-year deal with an optional third year with Djurgårdens IF of the SHL on May 2, 2017.

Following Djurgårdens IF relegation to the HockeyAllsvenskan in the 2021–22 season, Nilsson opted to remain in the SHL by originally agreeing to a two-year contract with Örebro HK on 16 April 2022. However, before the commencement of his deal, Nilsson opted to cancel his contract and later returned to Frölunda HC for the 2022–23 season on 18 July 2022.

Career statistics

Regular season and playoffs

International

References

External links

1993 births
Living people
Djurgårdens IF Hockey players
Frölunda HC players
Mora IK players
People from Tyresö Municipality
Swedish expatriate ice hockey players in Canada
Swedish ice hockey defencemen
Toronto Maple Leafs draft picks
Toronto Marlies players
Utica Comets players
Sportspeople from Stockholm County